may refer to one of many schools in Japan.

Kanto
 Chuo Elementary School (Tokyo)
 Chuo Elementary School (JA) - Sagamihara, Kanagawa Prefecture
 Chuo Elementary School (JA) - Warabi, Saitama Prefecture